Trupanea conjuncta is a species of tephritid or fruit flies in the genus Trupanea of the family Tephritidae.

Distribution
Mexico & United States.

References

Tephritinae
Insects described in 1904
Diptera of North America